Beidaihe railway station is a Chinese railway station located on the Beijing–Harbin railway and Tianjin–Qinhuangdao high-speed railway in Beidaihe District, Qinhuangdao, Hebei, China.

References

Railway stations in Hebei
Buildings and structures in Qinhuangdao
Stations on the Tianjin–Qinhuangdao High-Speed Railway